Katherine River is located in the Northern Territory, Australia. Its headwaters are in Nitmiluk National Park, it flows through the town of Katherine, and is a major tributary of the Daly River. The Katherine River drops around 384m over its 328 km length.

History

The first European to see and name the river was the Scottish explorer John McDouall Stuart on 4 July 1862, who named it Katherine after Catherine Chambers, the second daughter of expedition sponsor, the pastoralist James Chambers. The major town Katherine was named after the river.

In late January 1998, heavy rain associated with Cyclone Les raised the level of the river by more than 20 metres and flooded a large part of Katherine town. A more recent flood on 6 April 2006 caused a state of emergency to be declared. During this event the river peaked at a height of just below 19 metres at the Katherine bridge on the Stuart Highway.

Wildlife
Freshwater crocodiles inhabit the entire river, but while saltwater crocodiles are capable of travelling far upstream, no attacks have been recorded.

See also

List of rivers of Northern Territory

References

Rivers of the Northern Territory